Ma. Esperanza Christina Codilla Frasco (born Ma. Esperanza Christina Garcia Codilla; December 25, 1981), also known as Christina Garcia Frasco, is a Filipino politician serving as Secretary of Tourism since June 30, 2022. She was the mayor of Liloan, Cebu from 2016 to 2022.

Frasco is a lawyer by profession, having previously practiced international arbitration and commercial litigation in the Romulo Mabanta Buenaventura Sayoc and Delos Angeles law firm. She is the daughter of incumbent Cebu Governor Gwendolyn Garcia and granddaughter of former governor and representative Pablo P. Garcia.

Education
She took her Bachelor’s Degree in Legal Management from the Ateneo de Manila University. She then continued on to study Juris Doctor from the same university in 2006 and later on passed the bar examinations.

Political career

Mayor of Liloan (2016–2022)
Frasco was elected Mayor of Liloan in 2016, succeeding her husband Vincent Franco "Duke" Frasco. She was re-elected to her second term in 2019.

In 2021, Frasco was awarded the prestigious Presidential Lingkod Bayan Regional Award by the Civil Service Commission in its 2021 Search for Outstanding Government Workers for her exemplary performance as a Local Chief Executive through proactive initiatives towards innovation in governance and sustainable and inclusive programs fostering excellence in government service. The Presidential Lingkod Bayan Award is conferred upon an individual for exceptional or extraordinary contributions resulting from performance that had nationwide impact on public interest, security, and patrimony.

In a recent non-commissioned public satisfaction survey in August 2021, Frasco was the Top Performing Mayor in Central Visayas, ranking number 1 among the 116 Mayors in the entire Region VII, and number 1 among all 44 Municipal Mayors in the Province of Cebu.

Under Frasco’s administration, Liloan was awarded the Top Philippine Model Municipality in 2019 by The Manila Times. In the same year, Liloan was granted other national awards, namely, the Top Philippine Education Hub for its successful scholarship program that has supported over 10,000 scholars, Top Philippine Retirement Haven for programs promoting meaningful and joyful ageing among senior citizens, and Top Philippine Wealth Center for business friendliness and proactive programs on infrastructure and economic development. The local government was also awarded  an “Unqualified Opinion” from the Commission on Audit in 2017, 2019, 2020. In 2019 and 2020, the Department of Trade and Industry awarded Liloan as the Most Resilient Municipality in the Philippines.

In 2019, Frasco was elected as President of the League of Municipalities of the Philippines (LMP) – Cebu Chapter and as National Vice President of LMP. In July 2021, Frasco was appointed as the spokesperson of Davao City Mayor Sara Duterte.

Secretary of Tourism (2022–present)
Frasco ran for reelection in the 2022 Cebu local elections and was successful in winning her third term. However, she was later selected as the next Secretary of Tourism by president-elect Bongbong Marcos; she later accepted the offer. As mayor of Liloan, she was succeeded by her running mate and cousin-in-law, Aljew Frasco, who was initially elected as vice mayor in the elections.

Personal life
Frasco married Vincent Franco "Duke" Frasco, the incumbent representative of the 5th district of Cebu, in August 2009. They have four children together.

References

|-

1981 births
Living people
PDP–Laban politicians
Lakas–CMD politicians
Ateneo de Manila University alumni
Bongbong Marcos administration cabinet members
21st-century Filipino lawyers
People from Cebu
Women members of the Cabinet of the Philippines
21st-century Filipino women politicians
Women mayors of places in the Philippines
Filipino women lawyers